Echinophallidae is a family of flatworms belonging to the order Bothriocephalidea.

Genera

Genera:
 Bothriocotyle Ariola, 1900
 Dactylobothrium Srivastav, Khare & Jadhav, 2006
 Echinophallus Schumacher, 1914

References

Platyhelminthes